Joseph Mhlongo (born 25 September 1990) is a South African soccer player who plays as a midfielder for South African Premier Division side Moroka Swallows.

Club career
Born in Tembisa, He joined Free State Stars in the summer of 2015, but left the club in the September of that year.

He left Black Leopards at the end of the 2019–20 season.

He signed for Moroka Swallows on a two-year contract in September 2020.

References

Living people
1990 births
South African soccer players
People from Tembisa
Sportspeople from Gauteng
Association football midfielders
Roses United F.C. players
F.C. Cape Town players
Black Leopards F.C. players
South African Premier Division players
National First Division players
Free State Stars F.C. players
Moroka Swallows F.C. players